The West Kortright Centre is a non-profit arts and community center in Delaware County, New York. Prior to 1975, the building housed the West Kortright Presbyterian Church. The building was added to the National Register of Historic Places in 2002.

Performers 
Artists presented at the West Kortright Centre over the past 40 years have included:

Composers
John Cage
Meredith Monk
Peter Schickele
Virgil Thomson

Poets 
Allen Ginsberg
Sekou Sundiata 
Hayden Carruth

Bluegrass, country, and roots musicians 
Rhonda Vincent
J.D. Crowe
The Cox Family
Claire Lynch
Mary Gauthier

Traditional musicians 
Queen Ida and her Zydeco Band
Solas
Fairfield Four
Johnny Cunningham
Susan McKeown
Karan Casey
Barachois

Jazz performers 
Jack DeJohnette 
Teddy Wilson
Mulgrew Miller 
Kenny Burrell
Jacky Terrasson
Steve Lacy
Sonny Fortune
Dakota Staton

Folk musicians 
Greg Brown
Leo Kottke
Amos Lee
Odetta
The Roches
Nellie McKay
Richie Havens

Blues musicians
Mose Allison
Henry Butler
Clarence “Gatemouth” Brown
John P. Hammond 
The Holmes Brothers
James Cotton

Olu Dara
Pinetop Perkins
Junior Wells

Monologists 
Paul Zaloom

International performers 
Antibalas Afrobeat Orchestra
Hassan Hakmoun
Bhundu Boys
Luciana Souza
The Skatalites
Susana Baca

References

External links
 West Kortright Centre - official site

Performing arts centers in New York (state)
Tourist attractions in Delaware County, New York